The Peggy Neville Show is a Canadian music variety television series which aired on CBC Television from 1966 to 1967.

Premise
Peggy Neville (Red River Jamboree) hosted this entertainment series from Winnipeg.

Guest artists included Lenny Breau, Ed Evanko, Rich Little and Ray St. Germain. Kellogg's was a primary series sponsor.

Bob McMullin led the house band and arranged music for the series.

Scheduling
This 15-minute series was broadcast on Wednesdays at 7:45 p.m. from 5 January to 29 June 1966 and for a full season on Wednesdays at 7:30 p.m. from 5 October 1966 to 28 June 1967 at which time CBC cancelled the series.

References

External links
 

CBC Television original programming
1966 Canadian television series debuts
1967 Canadian television series endings
1960s Canadian variety television series
1960s Canadian music television series